Silla was a Korean kingdom from 57 BC to 935 AD.

Silla may also refer to:

Arts and religion
 Lucio Silla, a Mozart opera
Mr. Silla & Mongoose, an Icelandic electronic music group
 Crowns of Silla, ceremonial artifacts made in the kingdom of Silla
 Silla (opera), an opera seria by George Frideric Handel
 Silla (Graun), 1753 opera by Graun
 Silap Inua, a deity in Inuit mythology
 Zillah (biblical figure) or Tselah, one of Lamech's wives in the Bible
 A character in Barnabe Rich's History of Apolonius and Silla in his Farewell to Military Profession (1581)

People
Silla (name)
 Sulla (died 78 BC), Roman general and dictator
 Silla (rapper) (born 1984), German rapper formerly known as Godsilla

Places
Silla, Sultanpur Lodhi, a village in India
Silla, Mali, a village on the Niger, 130 km (80 mi) south from Ségou
Silla, Valencia, a town in Spain

Estonia
Silla, Lääne County, village in Kullamaa Parish, Lääne County
Silla, Pärnu County, village in Paikuse Parish, Pärnu County
Silla, Saare County, village in Mustjala Parish, Saare County

Elevations named after the Spanish word silla
Silla Pata, a mountain in Bolivia
Silla Qhata, a mountain in Peru
Silla Q'asa (disambiguation)
The Cerro de la Silla 1,820 m (5,971 ft) to the east of Monterrey, Mexico
La Silla, the location of the La Silla Observatory
Silla de Paita, a hill near the northern Peruvian sea port Paita
A hill in Cuba overlooking Gibara
Silla de Caracas, twin hills near the Venezuelan capital
Silla de Torrellas, a peak on the Spanish island Majorca

Other
Silla language, spoken in the Korean kingdom
Silla University in Busan, South Korea
Silla restoration movement in the 12th century in Korea 
Silla–Tang alliance in the 12th century in Korea 
Silla (month), the fourth month in the Nepal Era calendar
Silla CF, a Spanish football club based in the city of the same name
Silla, the kind of litter carried by Sillero porters in the Americas

See also
Sila (disambiguation)
Zillah (disambiguation)
Shilla (disambiguation)